Tomáš Bartejs (born 4 September 1992) is a Czech professional ice hockey defenceman. He currently plays for HC Kometa Brno in the Czech Extraliga (ELH).

Career
Bartejs made his Czech Extraliga debut playing with Piráti Chomutov debut during the 2012–13 Czech Extraliga season. He has two gold medals with HC Kometa Brno in 2016–17 Czech Extraliga season and 2017–18 Czech Extraliga season.

Career statistics

Regular season and playoffs

References

External links

1992 births
Living people
Czech ice hockey defencemen
Piráti Chomutov players
SK Horácká Slavia Třebíč players
HC Kometa Brno players
Metallurg Zhlobin players
Sportovní Klub Kadaň players
Sportspeople from Třebíč
HC Karlovy Vary players
Czech expatriate ice hockey people
Czech expatriate sportspeople in Belarus
Expatriate ice hockey players in Belarus